Holly Irene Robinson  (born 10 December 1994) is a New Zealand para-athlete, primarily competing in the javelin throw. She represented New Zealand at the 2012, 2016 and 2020 Summer Paralympics, winning silver in 2016 and gold in 2020. At the 2016 Games, she was New Zealand's flagbearer for the opening ceremony.

Early life
Robinson was born in Hokitika, on the South Island's West Coast, and is of Ngāi Tahu descent. She has a twin brother, Jonathon, and her father Steve represented the West Coast in Heartland Championship rugby. Robinson has a congenital limb reduction with her left arm ending below the elbow. She attended Westland High School and later Taieri College after moving to Dunedin.

Sporting career
Robinson started competing in para-athletics at age 12. She is classified F46 for field events and T47 for track events and long jump. Robinson's first major international competition was the 2011 IPC Athletics World Championships in Christchurch, New Zealand, achieving a fifth-place ranking in the women's javelin throw F46 and a seventh-place ranking in the women's shot put F42-44/46. She was selected to represent New Zealand at the 2012 Summer Paralympics, the sole female athletics competitor selected. She finished seventh in the women's javelin F46, with a 32.58 m throw. Robinson won her first international competition medal at the 2013 IPC Athletics World Championships, earning a silver medal with a 34.37 m throw.

At the 2015 IPC Athletics World Championships, Robinson earned a bronze medal with a 38.18 m throw. At the 2016 Australian Athletics Championships she set a New Zealand national record with a throw of 40.81 m, ranking her number one in the world for the javelin F46 during the Paralympic qualifying period and earning her a slot at the 2016 Paralympics Games. She was officially confirmed to represent New Zealand at the Paralympics on 23 May 2016.

At the 2016 Summer Paralympics, Robinson won the silver medal in the women's javelin throw F46, with a personal best throw of 41.22 m. At the 2018 Commonwealth Games, Robinson won the silver medal in the women's javelin throw with a personal best throw of 43.32m.

In September 2021 Robinson donated a US$50,000 prize to Ronald McDonald House South Island.

In the 2022 Queen's Birthday and Platinum Jubilee Honours, Robinson was appointed a  Member of the New Zealand Order of Merit, for services to athletics.

Statistics

Personal bests

Javelin throw progression

References

External links
  (archive)
 
 Meet Our Paralympians: Holly Robinson – Attitude Live video profile

1994 births
Living people
People from Hokitika
New Zealand twins
Ngāi Tahu people
New Zealand Māori sportspeople
New Zealand female javelin throwers
Paralympic athletes of New Zealand
Athletes (track and field) at the 2012 Summer Paralympics
Athletes (track and field) at the 2016 Summer Paralympics
Athletes (track and field) at the 2018 Commonwealth Games
Medalists at the 2016 Summer Paralympics
Paralympic silver medalists for New Zealand
Commonwealth Games silver medallists for New Zealand
Commonwealth Games medallists in athletics
People educated at Taieri College
People educated at Westland High School, Hokitika
Paralympic medalists in athletics (track and field)
Athletes (track and field) at the 2020 Summer Paralympics
Paralympic gold medalists for New Zealand
Medalists at the 2020 Summer Paralympics
Members of the New Zealand Order of Merit
Medallists at the 2018 Commonwealth Games